Miejski Ludowy Klub Sportowy Noteć Łabiszyn is a football club from Łabiszyn, Poland. It was found in 1974. They are currently playing in Polish Fourth League (V level).

External links
 Official website

Association football clubs established in 1974
1974 establishments in Poland
Żnin County
Football clubs in Kuyavian-Pomeranian Voivodeship